Sharifah Amani binti Syed Zainal Rashid Al-Yahya (born 10 June 1986), better known by her stage name Sharifah Amani, is a Malaysian actress. She is the best known for her role as Orked in Yasmin Ahmad's 'Orked' trilogy (Sepet, Gubra and Mukhsin).

Biography
She is the second daughter of veteran Malaysian actress, Fatimah Abu Bakar. Sharifah is mixed of Arab-Chinese-Bengali parentage and speaks fluent English, Malay and some Hindi. As a teenage writer for the New Straits Times YouthQuake slot, Amani covered assignments like the Shah Rukh Khan and Juhi Chawla press conference, concerts by Bollywood stars, Deep Purple and the 3rd IIFA Awards in Genting Highlands. Sharifah has also dabbled in theatre, having acted as Ophelia in the Bangsar Actors Studio's Hamlet (2005), directed by Faridah Merican.

Personal life
On September 10, 2022, she legally married the man of her choice who is also the CEO of Impact Integrated, Ahmed Faris Amir. The couple were married by the Head Imam of the Saidina Umar Al Khattab Mosque, Bukit Damansara and the Assistant Registrar of Marriages, Department of Islamic Religion in the Federal Territory (JAWI), Ustaz Mohd Rahimi P Ramlee officiated by the bride's father, Syed Zainal Rashid bin Syed Zainal Abidin Al-Yahya.

Career

Film
She is most famous for portraying the character Orked in Yasmin Ahmad's Orked trilogy. The first two films are Sepet and Gubra. In the latest instalment, Mukhsin, Sharifah Amani plays the adult version of Orked who "meets" her 10-year-old self (played by her younger sister, Sharifah Aryana). She previously played the supporting role as a sexually abused teenager in the film Gol & Gincu.

She co-stars in the Malaysian film, Cinta, where she is one of ten actors playing 5 different couples portraying different situations based on the theme of love and relationships. Her mother co-stars with her in this movie. In the Cantonese Malaysian horror movie, Possessed, she plays a supporting role as Fara, the assistant and close friend of a Chinese girl, Lisu, who migrated to Malaysia to make it big as a singer. Unfortunately, Lisu is brutally murdered and Fara, as the only witness of the murder, goes insane and is committed to a mental asylum.

She is the main cast in Muallaf, where she acts with Sharifah Aleysha, another one of her younger sisters. This film is also directed by Yasmin Ahmad. To fulfil her role in the movie, she shaved her head bald because in one of the scenes in the movie her character's head is shaved by the father for being too 'wild'.

Television
Following the relative success of Gol & Gincu in the supporting role as a sexually abused teenager, she reprises this role later in several guest appearances in the TV series based on the movie (Gol & Gincu The Series), as originally broadcast in 2006 on the Malaysian TV channel, 8TV. In 2006, she also hosted a make-over TV show (sponsored by Revlon Silky Girl) on NTV7 with her elder sister, Sharifah Aleya.

In March 2007, TV3 has started broadcasting the dramedy series Emil Emilda in their Samarinda timeslot, starring Sharifah Amani as the lead role of Emilda. She stars in title role of Emilda, a bespectacled geeky filing clerk working in a fictitious TV station, where she catches the attention of the CEO due to her hard-working nature and passion for the broadcasting industry. The CEO finds out his long-lost son, Emil/Boboi who has been missing following a car accident 20 years ago has been sighted. En route to follow up on the information regarding his son, he dies when his private helicopter crashes. It is then revealed in his will that he has chosen Emilda to be his temporary replacement as CEO until his son can be located to be his rightful heir.

Controversy
In 2006 at the 19th Malaysian Film Festival, when accepting her award as Best Actress she said "I sound, like, stupid, if I speak Malay, so I'll speak English". This statement had been interpreted by some parties as if Sharifah was ridiculing the Malay language (being an official language used in the ceremony plus at the national level in Malaysia) when she had meant that she was not really fluent in it. She later claimed that she was misquoted when her statement was translated by the Malay media.

Filmography

Film

Other film credits

Television series

Telemovie

Television

Podcast

Awards and nominations
18th Malaysian Film Festival 2005
 Most Promising Newcomer Award (Sepet)
19th Malaysian Film Festival 2006
 Best Actress Award (Gubra) * the youngest winner of the category (20 years old)

References

External links 
 
 Sharifah Amani profile at Sinema Malaysia
 Yahoo Celebrity Bio

1986 births
Living people
Malaysian people of Malay descent
Malaysian film actresses
Malaysian people of Arab descent
Malaysian people of Chinese descent
Malaysian television personalities
Malaysian people of Bengali descent
Malaysian Muslims
Malaysian television actresses
Malaysian child actresses
21st-century Malaysian actresses
Akademi Fantasia